Samuel Cahen (4 August 1796, Metz, France – 8 January 1862, Paris) was a French Hebraist and journalist.

Early life
Cahen was brought up at Mainz. He pursued a course of rabbinical studies while simultaneously devoting much attention to modern languages and literatures. After completing his education Cahen was engaged as a private tutor in Germany. In 1822 he went to Paris, where he assumed the directorship of the Jewish Consistorial School, a position which he held for a number of years. In 1840, Cahen founded the Archives Israélites, a French Jewish review.

Major Work
Cahen's main work was the translation of the Jewish Bible into French, with the Hebrew on opposite pages, and critical notes and dissertations by himself and others. The entire edition, consisting of eighteen volumes, appeared at Paris in 1851. Despite adverse criticism, denying Cahen critical perception in the choice of his material, the undertaking exerted a great influence upon a whole generation of French Jewry. In addition to this monumental work of his, Cahen was the author of the following:

Cours de Lecture Hébraïque, Suivi de Plusieurs Prières, avec Traduction Interlinéaire, et d'un Petit Vocabulaire Hébreu-Français, Metz, 1824
Précis d'instruction religieuse, 1829
A new French translation of the Haggadah of Passover, Paris, 1831–32
Almanach Hébreu, 1831.

Cahen was appointed a chevalier of the Legion of Honor in 1849.

Burials at Père Lachaise Cemetery
Chevaliers of the Légion d'honneur
French Hebraists
French journalists
Writers from Metz
Translators of the Bible into French
1796 births
1862 deaths
French male non-fiction writers
19th-century translators
19th-century French male writers